General Pavel Petrovich Liprandi (15 January 1796 – 27 August 1864) was a Russian military officer of Spanish-Italian descent who participated in the Crimean War.

Life

Napoleonic Wars and postwar
Pavel fought with the corps in the battles of Tarutino, Maloyaroslavets and Krasnoi.

In 1816 Liprandi was appointed adjutant to General , head of the 16th Division; in 1818 (already at the rank of captain) he was transferred to the Life Guards Grenadier Regiment. In 1822 he was transferred to the general staff, with his appointment as adjutant to the corps commander General , with whom he soon became friends and through whom he became known to Count Mikhail Semyonovich Vorontsov and Pavel Kiselyov. Close interaction with these commanders had a great influence on Liprandi, as was to become manifest later, when he took command himself.

Russo-Turkish War and November Uprising
Before the Russo-Turkish War of 1828–29, as adjutant and chief of staff to General Kiselev, Liprandi was ordered to the fortress of Isaccea Pasha to deliver the Russian declaration of war, with a secret commission to examine the fortress and find out if the Turks had intelligence of the Russian army's movements. Brilliantly fulfilling this assignment, he was sent to Galaţi in order to find out whether there were suitable vessels for the transport of troops in the planned expedition to Isaccea, another mission he successfully executed. In May 1828 Liprandi participated in the siege and occupation of the fortress of Brailov and, after the Russian troops crossed the Danube, he was sent to General  with orders to capture Isaccea and the road to Brailov, Babadag and Tulcea. On 8 July he participated in the Battle of Shumen and for his conduct there was awarded the Order of St. Vladimir, 4th degree with bow. In 1829, as a lieutenant-colonel, Liprandi was given a secret order to observe everything that took place in the Austrian Empire and to go the border of Moldova and there gather as accurate information as possible on the Austrians' plans.

He then fought in the storming of Warsaw's fortifications, where he commanded 1st Brigade 2nd Infantry. When Baron Teodor Geismar was shot, Liprandi replaced him as commander of the entire assault column and was the first to ascend the ramparts of fortifications 54 and 22, for which he was awarded the Order of St. George 3rd degree number 453, with the citation "in reward for the courage and bravery shown on 25 and 26 August 1831 in the storming of the fortifications of Warsaw". After the conquest of Warsaw, he joined the vanguard of Lieutenant-General , pursued the retreating Polish rebels to Lublin and participated in the siege of the fortress at Lublin.

Military reform
At the end of hostilities Liprandi proceeded to implement reforms he had already started beforehand to improve soldier's living conditions, which he developed with generals Sabaneev, Kiselev and Vorontsov. On 26 March 1839 Liprandi was promoted to major general and given command of the  King Frederick William III Grenadier Regiment (later known as the  Life Guards of St. Petersburg) and in 1842 was appointed commander of the Semenov Life Guards Regiment. In 1844 he was granted the Order of Saint Stanislaus 1st class. Still concerned with improving the soldiers' living conditions, Liprandi created the role of special instruction company commander of a contentment company (later adopted by the leadership in all parts of the lifeguards), built a pumping tower with a filter for the regiment by the side of the Kryukov Canal and so improved the regiment's financial state that he could refuse sending soldiers to voluntary work. Throughout his 17 years commanding various regiments, Liprandi never arrested an officer or private unless he was condemned to corporal punishment, proving that the harsh methods of command more common at that time were prejudiced. In 1848 Liprandi was promoted to lieutenant general, appointed Chief of Staff of the Grenadier Corps and admitted to the Guards Corps, the General Staff and the lists of the Life Guards Semenov regiment.

Hungarian Revolution and Crimean War
With the announcement in 1849 of the military campaign in Hungary, Ivan Paskevich's proposal that Liprandi command the 12th Infantry Division was approved, and in the Crimean War Liprandi was appointed head of the Little Valahskiy unit, to cover the right flank of the Southern Army and protect Lesser Wallachia. Chepurchei Liprandi drove the Turks from Calafat, and received the Order of the White Eagle, with swords. From Bessarabia Liprandi's division moved to the Crimea. Emperor Nicholas I recommended Liprandi as commander in chief in the following terms: "To General Liprandi, can instruct a separate unit, and it can be safely relied upon, as an experienced general." Liprandi was not slow in justifying this recommendation. He commanded the army at the Battle of Balaklava, during which he was wounded by grenade shrapnel in the leg, but remained on the field. Liprandi went on to take part in the battles at Inkerman, and at the Chernaya.

Later life and death

In 1855 Liprandi was in command of 6th Infantry Corps, but in 1856 he took indefinite leave. By 1859, at the personal request of Emperor Alexander II, Liprandi took command of 2nd Infantry Corps, located in the Kingdom of Poland, but in 1861, due to a disagreement with the Viceroy of Poland, Karl Lambert, he was instead appointed a member of the Military Council, and in 1862 Inspector of troops. 

Family
Liprandi married Maria Fedorovna Talyzina (1808–1843) in 1833. She was the daughter of Lieutenant General F. I. Talyzin. Their son, Rafail Pavlovich (1838-1909) was a Major General of the General Staff. He fought with distinction in the Russo-Turkish War (1877–1878), including at the Battle of Shipka Pass, for which he was awarded gold weapons and the Order of St. George 4th class.

References

1796 births
1864 deaths
Russian people of Italian descent
Russian people of the November Uprising
Russian military personnel of the Crimean War
Recipients of the Order of St. George of the Third Degree
Russian military personnel of the Napoleonic Wars